Monaco is a surname. Notable people with the surname include:

Juan Mónaco (born 1984), Argentine tennis player
Kara Monaco (born 1983), 2006 Playmate of the Year
Kelly Monaco (born 1976), American model and actress
Lorenzo Monaco ( 1370 – 1425), Italian painter
Mario del Monaco (1915–1982), Italian tenor